Glimepiride, is an anti-diabetic medication used to treat type 2 diabetes. It is less preferred than metformin. Use is recommended together with diet and exercise. It is taken by mouth. Glimepiride takes up to three hours for maximum effect and lasts for about a day.

Common side effects include headache, nausea, and dizziness. Serious side effects may include low blood sugar. Use during pregnancy and breastfeeding is not recommended. It works mainly by increasing the amount of insulin released from the pancreas. It is classified as a second-generation sulfonylurea.

Glimepiride was patented in 1979 and approved for medical use in 1995. It is available as a generic medication. In 2020, it was the 87th most commonly prescribed medication in the United States, with more than 8million prescriptions.

Medical uses 

Glimepiride is indicated to treat type 2 diabetes mellitus; its mode of action is to increase insulin secretion by the pancreas. However it requires adequate insulin synthesis as prerequisite to treat appropriately. It is not used for type 1 diabetes because in type 1 diabetes the pancreas is not able to produce insulin.

Contraindications
Its use is contraindicated in patients with hypersensitivity to glimepiride or other sulfonylureas.

Adverse effects 
Side effects from taking glimepiride include gastrointestinal tract (GI) disturbances, occasional allergic reactions, and rarely blood production disorders including thrombocytopenia, leukopenia, and hemolytic anemia. In the initial weeks of treatment, the risk of hypoglycemia may be increased. Alcohol consumption and exposure to sunlight should be restricted because they can worsen side effects.

Interactions 
Nonsteroidal anti-inflammatory drugs (such as salicylates), sulfonamides, chloramphenicol, coumadin and probenecid may potentiate the hypoglycemic action of glimepiride. Thiazides, other diuretics, phothiazides, thyroid products, oral contraceptives, and phenytoin tend to produce hyperglycemia.

Mechanism of action 
Like all sulfonylureas, glimepiride acts as an insulin secretagogue. It lowers  blood sugar by stimulating the release of insulin by pancreatic beta cells and by inducing increased activity of intracellular insulin receptors.

Not all secondary sulfonylureas have the same risk of hypoglycemia. Glibenclamide (glyburide) is associated with an incidence of hypoglycemia of up to 20–30%, compared to as low as 2% to 4% with glimepiride. Glibenclamide also interferes with the normal homeostatic suppression of insulin secretion in reaction to hypoglycemia, whereas glimepiride does not. Also, glibenclamide diminishes glucagon secretion in reaction to hypoglycemia, whereas glimepiride does not.

Pharmacokinetics  
Gastrointestinal absorption is complete, with no interference from meals. Significant absorption can occur within one hour, and distribution is throughout the body,  99.5% bound to plasma protein. Metabolism is by oxidative biotransformation, it is hepatic and complete. First, the medication is metabolized to M1 metabolite by CYP2C9. M1 is further metabolized to M2 metabolite by cytosolic enzymes. M2 is pharmacologically inactive. Excretion in the urine is about 65%, and the remainder is excreted in the feces.

References

External links
 

Potassium channel blockers
1-(Benzenesulfonyl)-3-cyclohexylureas
Gamma-lactams
Sanofi
Wikipedia medicine articles ready to translate